Greek nouns  may refer to:

Ancient Greek nouns
Modern Greek grammar: Nouns